Marcus Leonardus "Mark" Verheijen (born 14 August 1976 in Baarlo, Netherlands) is a Dutch politician of the People's Party for Freedom and Democracy (Volkspartij voor Vrijheid en Democratie). He was Vice Chairman of that party from 2008 till 2012 and interim Chairman from 4 August 2010 to 20 May 2011. Between 20 September 2012 and 27 February 2015 he was an MP.

Previously he was a member of the municipal councils of Grubbenvorst and Venlo, an alderman and vice-mayor of Venlo from 2006 to 2011, a member of the provincial parliament of Limburg, and a member of the provincial executive of Limburg from 2011 to 2012.

Verheijen studied history, philosophy and law at Radboud University Nijmegen. He worked as a management consultant at Deloitte & Touche.

In 2015 information surfaced that Verheijen possibly wrongly claimed expenses in 2011 and 2012. Both private expenses and campaign-related party political expenses were claimed as expenses incurred during his work as a representative in the Provincial Parliament of Limburg. The Province of Limburg had an external organization investigate whether Verheijen's expenses charges were appropriate, the organization concluded that they were appropriate.
Because of the turmoil in the media Verheijen resigned as an MP on 27 February 2015.

Nowadays Verheijen is a consultant, writer and columnist for a Dutch newspaper. In July 2020 he published the book Wij kennen Amerika helemaal niet. Een reis door het land van de Trump-stemmers, about the US Presidential Elections.

References

External links 

 Parlement.com biography 

1976 births
Living people
Aldermen in Limburg (Netherlands)
People from Venlo
Dutch management consultants
Members of the House of Representatives (Netherlands)
Members of the Provincial-Executive of Limburg
Members of the Provincial Council of Limburg
People from Horst aan de Maas
People from Peel en Maas
People's Party for Freedom and Democracy politicians
Vice Chairmen of the People's Party for Freedom and Democracy
Radboud University Nijmegen alumni
21st-century Dutch politicians